Terpnomyia costalis is a species of ulidiid or picture-winged fly in the genus Terpnomyia of the family Ulidiidae.

References

Ulidiidae